There are over 20,000 Grade II* listed buildings in England. This page is a list of these buildings in the district of Cotswold in Gloucestershire.

List of buildings

|}

See also
 Grade II* listed buildings in Gloucestershire
 Grade II* listed buildings in Cheltenham
 Grade II* listed buildings in Forest of Dean
 Grade II* listed buildings in Gloucester
 Grade II* listed buildings in South Gloucestershire
 Grade II* listed buildings in Stroud (district)
 Grade II* listed buildings in Tewkesbury (borough)
 Grade I listed buildings in Cotswold (district)

Notes

External links

Cotswold District
 
Lists of Grade II* listed buildings in Gloucestershire